Binmaley, officially the Municipality of Binmaley,  is a 1st class municipality in the province of Pangasinan, Philippines. According to the 2020 census, it has a population of 86,881 people.

Binmaley is located along the western coastland of Pangasinan facing Lingayen Gulf, in between Lingayen and Dagupan.  On January 8–9, 1945, the amphibious forces of U.S. General Douglas MacArthur used the town's beach, designated as "yellow beach", alongside the beaches of Lingayen, Dagupan, and San Fabian, in their landing operations to liberate Luzon from Japanese occupation during World War II.

The town is famous for its bangus (milkfish) aqua-culture, due to the existence of its numerous fishponds (pokok in the Pangasinan language).  However, because of constant siltation over the past several years from mine tailings upstream from Agno River (due to mine operations in neighboring Benguet Province), and the overuse of artificial fish feeds, the bangus industry has suffered from fishkill, fewer viable fishponds and lower harvests.  As a result, many formerly productive fishponds have been converted into large commercial and residential lots.  This phenomenon is beginning to seriously threaten the unique Binmaley fishpond industry.  Current Government action is inadequate due to strong pressures from other competing commercial interests, not to mention fishfeed producers.

Binmaley's town center has a Neo classical church dating back to the 17th century.  It also became famous throughout the Philippines for the outstanding academic achievements of students (and its distinctive corps of military cadets) from its Binmaley Catholic High School, especially when it was headed by a German priest, Fr. Leo Behneke, in the 1960s and 1970s. Its name roughly means "the place which became a town" or "went to town" in the Pangasinan language.

Binmaley, is famously known for its "Sigay Festival". The Pangasinan word sigay broadly translates to harvest, or a time to gather the rich yields of the farm, the sea, the ponds and the rivers. It also relates to a contraction of the words silew, meaning light, and gayaga, meaning merriment. It was Mayor Lorenzo "Enzo" Cerezo who pioneered and founded "Sigay Festival".

Geography

Barangays
Binmaley is politically subdivided into 33 barangays. These barangays are headed by elected officials: Barangay Captain, Barangay Council, whose members are called Barangay Councilors. All are elected every three years.

 Amancoro
 Balagan
 Balogo
 Basing
 Baybay Lopez
 Baybay Polong
 Biec
 Buenlag
 Calit
 Caloocan Dupo
 Caloocan Norte
 Caloocan Sur
 Camaley
 Canaoalan
 Dulag
 Gayaman
 Linoc
 Lomboy
 Nagpalangan
 Malindong
 Manat
 Naguilayan
 Pallas
 Papagueyan
 Parayao
 Poblacion
 Pototan
 Sabangan
 Salapingao
 San Isidro Norte
 San Isidro Sur
 Santa Rosa
 Tombor

Climate

Demographics

Economy

Government
Binmaley, belonging to the second congressional district of the province of Pangasinan, is governed by a mayor designated as its local chief executive and by a municipal council as its legislative body in accordance with the Local Government Code. The mayor, vice mayor, and the councilors are elected directly by the people through an election which is being held every three years.

Elected officials

Heritage

Images

References

External links

 Binmaley Profile at PhilAtlas.com
 Municipal Profile at the National Competitiveness Council of the Philippines
 Binmaley at Pangasinan Government Website
 Local Governance Performance Management System
 [ Philippine Standard Geographic Code]
 Philippine Census Information

Municipalities of Pangasinan